The Prada Transformer is an unusual building which has one of four different apparent shapes, depending on the function for which the building is needed at the moment.  The building is roughly in the shape of a tetrahedron.  Cranes rotate the building so that different surfaces of the tetrahedron face downward, thereby changing the building's form and function.

The different faces of the "tetrahedron" are actually shapes other than triangles.  The building's base is a hexagon when used for a fashion exhibition, a rectangle when used as a movie theater, a cross when used for an art exhibition and a circle when used for a special event.

The building was funded by Prada, and designed by Rem Koolhaas' architecture firm Office for Metropolitan Architecture.

The building is located in Seoul, South Korea, next to the Gyeonghui Palace.

The building was first used for the fashion exhibition "Waist Down - Skirts by Miuccia Prada", which began April 25, 2009.  Its form and function was first changed on June 26, 2009, into a movie theater.

External links
Prada Transformer official web site

Buildings and structures completed in 2009
Rem Koolhaas buildings
Buildings and structures in Seoul